Downer is a suburb of Canberra, Australia, in the city's inner north. The suburb is bounded by Northbourne Avenue, Antill Street and Philip Avenue.

The suburb was gazetted in 1960 and named after Sir John Downer (1844–1915) Premier of South Australia and a member of the first Australian Senate in 1901. There is no specific theme for street names.

History

The buildings which make up the Downer community centre and shops, were built for the CSIRO in 1930s, and the area now comprising Downer was an agricultural research facility for the CSIRO. The area now comprising the suburb was used between 1939 and 1945 as a plantation for the growth of opium poppy to provide a source for medications in the unavailability of imported supplies. The large pine and gum trees which surround the block around the shops were planted in this time as a wind break for the CSIRO building. Large trees (Camden Woolybutts) along Swinden street were also planted then, as Swinden street was the driveway for the CSIRO building, where it connected to Northbourne Avenue.  With the development of the suburb the trees became diseased during the 1980s and a program is underway to replace them with more amenable local varieties of gum.  As of September 2008, all but two or three of the older Swinden Street gums have been removed.

Downer has a local oval between Frencham, Melba, Bonython and Bradfield streets, with a shopping centre. However, in 2005 the shopping centre was vacant due partly to the poor location of the centre away from major roads. The shops were refurbished in the late 2010s, with a new cafe and vet clinic. In May 2019 a bronze kangaroo sculpture was unveiled, to replace a previous kangaroo sculpture which went missing six years earlier.

Nearby, the Canberra Business Centre until recently occupied the site of the former Downer Primary School. The school closed in 1988.

Geology

Calcareous shales from the Canberra Formation is overlain by Quaternary alluvium.
This rock is the limestone of the original title of Canberra "Limestone Plains".

Footnotes

Suburbs of Canberra